Mauricio Fernando Castro Matamoros (born August 11, 1981 in Tegucigalpa) is a Honduran footballer who currently plays for Atlético Choloma in the Honduran National League.

Club career
Nicknamed Pipo, Castro began his career in his native Honduras, playing for six seasons in Honduras' top division, the Honduran National League, for F.C. Motagua, Universidad, Hispano and Olimpia.

Major League Soccer
Castro signed for the New England Revolution on February 15, 2008. He was seriously injured by Chicago Fire's Mexican forward Cuauhtemoc Blanco in his first season. After 30 appearances, including 25 starts, for the Revs in 2008 and 2009, Castro was released by the Revolution on May 14, 2010, having failed to make an appearance in the 2010 season.

In 2011 the left-sided midfielder returned to Honduras and signed with second division Municipal. He then joined Necaxa for the 2011 Apertura season and moved to Atlético Choloma ahead of the 2012 Clausura. He was said to have left Choloma in summer 2012 after playing only two matches into the 2012 Apertura season, since he had received only half of his salary but later declared that a talk with manager Edwin Pavón made him stay with the club.

International career
Castro made his debut for Honduras in a June 2003 friendly match against Guatemala and has earned a total of 5 caps, scoring no goals. He has represented his country at the 2007 UNCAF Nations Cup.

His final international was a March 2007 friendly match against El Salvador.

Personal life
Castro was born in Honduras' capital Tegucigalpa to Andrés Castro and Lourdes Matamoros. He is married  to Glenda and they have two children: Maurizio Alessandro Castro López and Katherine Yanel Castro López.

Honors

New England Revolution
North American SuperLiga: 1
 2008

References

External links

  
  

1981 births
Living people
Sportspeople from Tegucigalpa
Association football midfielders
Honduran footballers
Honduras international footballers
F.C. Motagua players
Hispano players
C.D. Olimpia players
New England Revolution players
Atlético Choloma players
Liga Nacional de Fútbol Profesional de Honduras players
Major League Soccer players
Honduran expatriate footballers
Expatriate soccer players in the United States
2007 UNCAF Nations Cup players